is a Shinto shrine in Esashi, Hokkaidō, Japan. Its foundation date is uncertain but its existence is documented from the Edo period. The Ubagami Daijingū Togyosai, when floats decked out with lanterns are paraded through the town, is celebrated in August.

References

See also
 Matsuri
 List of Shinto shrines in Hokkaidō

Shinto shrines in Hokkaido